Los Huipas refers to the media-coined nickname of a group of Mexican serial killers, all of whom were members of the Mayo ethnic group. They are considered the first serial killers of indigenous descent in the country.

 Eusebio Yocupicio Soto was the leader.

The rest of the members included: 
 Adelaido Huipas Quijano
 Leonardo Yocupicio Huipas
 Basilio Humo Valenzuela

All natives of Huatabampo, Sonora, the men were first and second cousins, whom allegedly had incestual homosexual relationships with one another. Rumors about their lifestyles led to them being marginalized and discriminated against by the rest of the community. Motivated by their desire for revenge, between 1949 and 1950, the gang ended up murdering seven men, who had previously ridiculed them. Using deception, they would lure their victims to a secluded hut, where they stabbed, strangled, or beat them to death. After the killings, they would mutilate the corpses, preserving the castrated genitals from the bodies.

They were arrested on April 13, 1950, following a complaint from Felipe Buitimia, the father of Los Huipas' last victim - Vicente Buitimia. The four were sentenced to death, but after the abolition of the death penalty in Mexico, each of their sentences were commuted to 30 years imprisonment. Eusebio and Basilio died in prison from tuberculosis, while Adelaido and Leonardo served out their sentences fully, with nothing known about them after their release.

References 

1940s murders in Mexico
Incidents of violence against men
Male serial killers
Mexican serial killers
Murder in Mexico
People from Huatabampo
Serial killers who died in prison custody
Violence against men in North America
1949 murders in Mexico
1950 murders in Mexico